Kirk David Morrison (born February 19, 1982) is a former American football linebacker in the National Football League (NFL). He was drafted by the Oakland Raiders in the third round of the 2005 NFL Draft and also played for the Jacksonville Jaguars and Buffalo Bills. He played college football at San Diego State.

Early years
Morrison attended elementary school at Sacred Heart, now called St. Martin de Porress, in Oakland, California. After 8th grade graduation he went to Bishop O'Dowd High School which is also in Oakland, California. He won varsity letters in football and track & field. In football, he led his team to two HAAL championships and two Northern California section 3A championships, was a two-time All-HAAL honoree, and as a senior, was the HAAL Defensive Player of the Year.

College career 
Morrison attended college at San Diego State University and had an outstanding playing career. While at SDSU, he was two-time Mountain West Defensive Player of the Year. Morrison is a brother of the Delta Epsilon chapter of Kappa Alpha Psi.

Professional career

Oakland Raiders 

Morrison played in all 16 games as a rookie, ending the season with 116 tackles and two pass deflections.

He finished the 2006 season with a team leading 128 tackles, a sack, a defensive touchdown, and two interceptions.

Morrison started the 2007 season with an interception in each of his first three games, joining Thomas Howard who had an interception through each of his first 4 games. He led the Oakland Raiders with 120 tackles, and tacked on 10 passes defended and a quarterback sack to his totals.

In 2008, Morrison ranked fifth in the NFL with 135 tackles. He also forced two fumbles and had one sack.

He finished the 2009 season tied 6th in the NFL with 133 tackles. He forced three fumbles, recovering one, and had two sacks while playing most of the season with a dislocated elbow.

Jacksonville Jaguars 
Morrison was traded to the Jacksonville Jaguars along with a fifth-round pick in the 2010 NFL Draft for the 108th pick in the same draft. Morrison's first game against his hometown and former team, the Oakland Raiders, was held in Jacksonville on December 12, 2010, the Jaguars won 38-31.

Buffalo Bills 
On August 24, 2011, he signed with the Buffalo Bills. On December 3, 2012, he was released by the Bills. He was signed again by the Bills on December 20, 2012.

Broadcasting career 

It was announced in March 2011 that Morrison, along with Rob Dibble, will be part of Fox Overtime on FoxSportsRadio.  
In 2013 Morrison worked as a color analyst for San Diego State football games on the "Mighty 1090" radio (XX SPORTS RADIO) in San Diego and surrounding areas, teaming with play-by-play announcer Ted Leitner. For the 2017 season he was replaced by Rich Ohrnberger, when SDSU switched to iHeart Media (XTRA 1360 AM and KGB 101.5 FM) to broadcast Aztec basketball and football games.

In August 2014 Morrison was named as one of several analysts who will team with Dick Stockton to call NFL on Fox games on a rotating basis.
On August 8, 2016, Morrison announced he was joining ESPN Los Angeles, covering Los Angeles Rams games.

References

External links 
 
 San Diego State Aztecs bio

1982 births
Living people
African-American players of American football
American football linebackers
Buffalo Bills players
College football announcers
Jacksonville Jaguars players
National Football League announcers
Oakland Raiders players
Players of American football from Oakland, California
San Diego State Aztecs football announcers
San Diego State Aztecs football players